John T. and Mary M. Doneghy House, also known as the Doneghy-Surbeck-Green House, is a historic home located at La Plata, Macon County, Missouri.  It was built about 1895, and is a -story, Queen Anne style frame dwelling.  It has an irregular plan, steep hipped roof with lower cross gables, and a one-story wraparound porch with centered turret and second story balcony.

It was listed on the National Register of Historic Places in 1990.

References

Houses on the National Register of Historic Places in Missouri
Queen Anne architecture in Missouri
Houses completed in 1895
Houses in Macon County, Missouri
National Register of Historic Places in Macon County, Missouri